1933–34 American Soccer League  was the first season of the second American Soccer League.

Overview
The league included two teams, New York Americans and New York Brookhattan that had also played in the original ASL. The USFA awarded the new ASL exclusive rights to organize professional soccer on the Atlantic Coast. The new ASL operated at a considerably lower level of professionalism than its predecessor. With the Great Depression still raging, it was not possible to offer salaries anywhere near the level enjoyed by the previous league.

The inaugural season of 1933–34 saw a fairly impressive level of competition, as well as a few of the stars of the old league including Archie Stark and George Moorhouse. New York Americans in particular had a wealth of familiar names including Stan Chesney and Erno Schwarz in addition to Moorhouse. Kearny Irish were the first league champions in the Metropolitan Division, winning the league title by a comfortable 4 points ahead of New York Americans. Kearny Scots finished a distant third. After 12 games Brooklyn F.C. merged with Hispano F.C. The aggregation was renamed Brooklyn Hispano Football Club which began play on January 21, 1934 and assumed the record of Hispano F.C. in the standings.

Metropolitan Division

New England Division

First half

Second half

Top goalscorers

References

American Soccer League (1933–1983) seasons
1
United